Australian singer-songwriter Sia has released nine studio albums, six live albums, 67 singles (including 22 as a featured artist), and 42 music videos. In 1997, she released her debut studio album entitled OnlySee. It was commercially unsuccessful, and none of its songs were released as a single. Sia released her second album, Healing Is Difficult, in 2001. The album yielded three singles: "Taken for Granted", "Little Man" and "Drink to Get Drunk". The lead single, "Taken for Granted", peaked at number 10 on the UK Singles Chart.

In 2004, Sia released her third studio album, Colour the Small One. Its singles included "Don't Bring Me Down", "Breathe Me", "Where I Belong" and "Numb". "Breathe Me" was the most successful single from Colour the Small One, peaking at number 19 in Denmark, number 71 in the United Kingdom and number 81 in France. In 2008, Sia released her fourth studio album, Some People Have Real Problems. The album was certified gold by the Australian Recording Industry Association (ARIA), and spawned four singles: "Day Too Soon", "The Girl You Lost to Cocaine", "Soon We'll Be Found" and "Buttons". The follow-up We Are Born was made available in 2010. It was certified gold by the ARIA, and generated the singles "You've Changed", "Clap Your Hands", "Bring Night" and "I'm in Here".

In 2011, Sia was featured on the top-ten singles "Titanium" by David Guetta and "Wild Ones" by Flo Rida. In 2013, Sia contributed the song "Elastic Heart" to the soundtrack to the 2013 American film The Hunger Games: Catching Fire. A year later, she released her sixth studio album, 1000 Forms of Fear. It became Sia's most successful release, peaking atop the record charts of Australia, Canada and the United States. It was soon certified platinum in Australia and gold in France. As of January 2016, the album had sold 1 million copies worldwide. Its lead single, "Chandelier", became Sia's first hit single as lead artist, peaking within the top ten of charts in various countries. 1000 Forms of Fear was further promoted by the singles "Big Girls Cry", Sia's solo version of "Elastic Heart" and "Fire Meet Gasoline".

Sia's seventh album, This Is Acting, was released in 2016. It became her second consecutive chart-topping album in Australia and peaked within the top ten in various countries, including Canada, the United Kingdom and the United States. Its two top ten singles in her native country were "Alive" and "Cheap Thrills" (solo or featuring singer/rapper Sean Paul). The latter became her most successful song as a lead artist, reaching the top five in many European countries and peaking at number one on the US Billboard Hot 100, where it became Sia's first song to do so. In 2017, Sia signed with Atlantic Records and released Everyday Is Christmas, her Christmas album which featured 10 original songs, co-written and produced by Greg Kurstin. "Santa's Coming for Us" served as the only single from the album. The album was reissued in 2018 with three new songs, one of which was a cover of Perry Como's "Round and Round". In 2018, Sia formed group LSD alongside British singer-songwriter Labrinth and American producer Diplo. They released their self-titled album through Columbia Records in April 2019, which featured the singles "Genius", "Audio" and "Thunderclouds".

Sia's ninth studio album, Music – Songs from and Inspired by the Motion Picture, was released in February 2021, in connection with the release of her directorial debut film Music. The album's lead single, "Together", was released in May 2020.

For her work as a songwriter, she had sold 25 million songs worldwide as of October 2014. Sia had earned over 50 billion streams across her career, globally, as of November 2020.

Albums

Studio albums

Compilation albums

Live albums

Remixes albums

Video albums

Singles

As lead artist

As featured artist

Promotional singles

Other charted songs

Songwriting and other appearances

Music videos

Featured videos

Guest appearances

Notes

References 

Discographies of Australian artists
Discography